The Tecnam 2010 is a four-seat, high wing, single engine light aircraft of mixed metal and carbon-fiber-reinforced polymer construction. Designed and built in Italy, it was first presented in public in April 2011.

Design
The Tecnam P2010 is a larger, four seat relative of the Tecnam P2008 two seat braced high wing light aircraft. Both types have metal wings and tailplane on a composite fuselage with integrated fin.

The wing leading edge is straight except for some pinching at the root and the wing has constant chord on the inner section.  Outboard, the trailing edge is tapered; the straight wing tips are slightly upturned. Ailerons span the outboard panels and the inner sections carry flaps. There is a single lift strut on each side, attached to the lower fuselage. The P2010 has a low set all-moving constant-chord tailplane with an anti-balance tab. The fin is swept and the rudder moves above the tailplane.

The P2010 is powered by a 135 kW (180 hp) Lycoming IO-360-M1A horizontally opposed four cylinder piston engine, with a 215 hp Lycoming IO-390 option available. The cabin seats the pilot and three passengers in two side-by-side rows, accessed by three doors. Its fixed tricycle undercarriage has spring cantilever main legs and a castoring nosewheel. All wheels have speed fairings.

Development
The P2010 was first seen in public at AERO Friedrichshafen 2011 and first flew on 12 April 2012. The company initially planned to have US FAR Part 23 certification completed by November 2012 and said it would refund deposits if the aircraft was not certified by the end of 2014. European European Aviation Safety Agency certification was completed in September 2014, with American Federal Aviation Administration certification completed in December 2015.

On 27 May 2020, Tecnam introduced a diesel-powered upgrade, the P2010 TDI, with a liquid-cooled 170-hp (127kW) turbocharged Continental CD-170 engine capable of using either diesel or jet fuel. Its 5.2 gph consumption provides a significant range increase (1050nm vs. 660nm for gasoline-powered version). Certification by the European Union Aviation Safety Agency (EASA) was expected to be completed by July 2020, with approval from other countries to follow. The diesel engine's range advantage was balanced by three disadvantages: the engine must be replaced after 1,200 hrs; the unit price increased to around $412,000 USD (from $345,000 USD for the gasoline version); and cruise speed is lower (136kt, vs. 145kt for the 215hp gasoline version).

The P2010 TDI was EASA certified on 20 October 2020 and US Federal Aviation Administration certified in November 2021, with the liquid-cooled, four-cylinder Continental CD-170.

A hybrid aircraft demonstrator version of the P2010 was first flown on 21 December 2021. Powered by a  Rotax 915iS piston engine coupled to a  Rolls-Royce electric motor, the aircraft is not intended for sale, but for developmental purposes.

Tecnam introduced the Gran Lusso (Great Luxury) version in July 2022. Equipped with the turbocharged Continental CD-170, this variant introduces improved crew comfort and ergonomic improvements designed by the company's Centro Stile (Style Centre) design team.

Operational history
Tecnam announced that they sold 30 delivery positions for P2010s at Aero 2011. By July 2015, 25 aircraft had been delivered to customers.

Specifications

See also

References

External links

 Official company video of first flight
 We Fly: Tecnam P2010

Tecnam aircraft
2010s Italian civil utility aircraft
Single-engined tractor aircraft
High-wing aircraft
Aircraft first flown in 2012